Muslim University Riding Club (MURC) established as M.A.O. College riding school is a 130 year old club of the Aligarh Muslim University. The players of the club have also featured in the London magazine in 1974.  MURC is the only riding club in a university in India. It also has a strong 19 member riding squad. The club is open for both the sexes.

The club also publishes an annual magazine 'Equestre'.

History 
The club started when Sir Syed Ahmad Khan asked some landlords to send their horses to the college, so that the students could learn the art of horsemanship. The proposal was accepted and horse riding started in 1889. Nawab Mohd. Ismail Khan Sherwani laid the foundation of the riding club, and also presented four horses. A formal riding school was founded in 1893, at the suggestion of Theodore Morison.

Rs 5 was charged from each student and Rs 3 who brought their own horses at the start of the riding school.

Naseeruddin Haider was the Captain in the early 1940s.N R Madhavan Menon was also the captain. Few notable Presidents of the club are Rajeev Sharma and Iqbal Ghani Khan.

Awards and recognition 
The riding team won twenty nine medals in the Great Ghaziabad Horse Show "Penta Grand 2012" and Delhi Horse Show 2012 organized by Army Polo and Riding Club.

References

External links
Official website of Aligarh Muslim University

Aligarh Muslim University
Clubs and societies of the Aligarh Muslim University
1893 establishments in India
Sports clubs established in 1893